Horst "Schimmi" Szymaniak (29 August 1934 – 9 October 2009) was a German footballer who played as a midfielder.

Club career 
Szymaniak was born in Oer-Erkenschwick. The clubs he played for include: SpVgg Erkenschwick, Wuppertaler SV, Karlsruher SC, Calcio Catania, F.C. Internazionale Milano, A.S. Varese 1910, and Tasmania 1900 Berlin for whom he played in the 1965–66 season, the side's only season in the Bundesliga.

Szymaniak was a defensive midfielder who usually played as a left half back and less frequently as an inside forward. He had very good ball skills, had good vision and was able to make unerringly accurate long passes to a teammate. He was renowned for his slide tackling ability, so much so this became his trademark ability.

He was renowned as one of the best players in German football during the late 1950s and early 1960s, with kicker (sports magazine) rating him world class five times between 1957 and 1961 in their biennial Rangliste des deutschen Fußballs (ranking list of German football).

International career 
Szymaniak played 43 times and scored two goals for the West Germany national team between 1956 and 1966, and was chosen to play in both the 1958 and the 1962 World Cups, but was omitted by Helmut Schön from his 1966 squad.

Death 
Szymaniak died after a long illness on 9 October 2009 in a nursing home in Melle near Osnabrück.

References 

1934 births
2009 deaths
German footballers
West German expatriate footballers
Germany international footballers
Germany B international footballers
Wuppertaler SV players
Karlsruher SC players
Bundesliga players
Catania S.S.D. players
Inter Milan players
S.S.D. Varese Calcio players
FC Biel-Bienne players
Chicago Spurs players
SpVgg Erkenschwick players
Serie A players
Expatriate footballers in Italy
Expatriate footballers in Switzerland
Expatriate soccer players in the United States
West German expatriate sportspeople in Italy
West German expatriate sportspeople in Switzerland
West German expatriate sportspeople in the United States
1958 FIFA World Cup players
1962 FIFA World Cup players
Association football midfielders
People from Recklinghausen (district)
Sportspeople from Münster (region)
SC Tasmania 1900 Berlin players
Footballers from North Rhine-Westphalia
West German footballers